Calodexia is a Neotropical genus of parasitic flies in the family Tachinidae.  Females follow columns of army ants, apparently waiting for cockroaches to be flushed from hiding.

Species
Calodexia agilis Curran, 1934
Calodexia aldrichi Curran, 1934
Calodexia apicalis Curran, 1934
Calodexia bella Curran, 1934
Calodexia bequaerti Curran, 1934
Calodexia bigoti Nihei & Dios, 2016
Calodexia callani Thompson, 1968
Calodexia caudata Curran, 1934
Calodexia continua Curran, 1934
Calodexia dives Curran, 1934
Calodexia fasciata Curran, 1934
Calodexia flavescens (Townsend, 1935)
Calodexia flavicornis (Wulp, 1890)
Calodexia flavipes (Schiner, 1868)
Calodexia fulvibasis Curran, 1934
Calodexia fumosa (Townsend, 1912)
Calodexia fuscus (Townsend, 1935)
Calodexia globosa (Reinhard, 1953)
Calodexia grata (Wulp, 1890)
Calodexia insolita Curran, 1934
Calodexia interrupta Curran, 1934
Calodexia lateralis (Curran, 1934)
Calodexia major Curran, 1934
Calodexia majuscula Wulp, 1891
Calodexia mattoensis (Townsend, 1939)
Calodexia mexicana (Townsend, 1915)
Calodexia neofumosa Nihei & Dios, 2016
Calodexia nigripes Thompson, 1968
Calodexia panamensis Curran, 1934
Calodexia panamensis (Townsend, 1919)
Calodexia peponis (Reinhard, 1953)
Calodexia rubripes Thompson, 1968
Calodexia scurra (Wulp, 1890)
Calodexia signata (Wulp, 1890)
Calodexia similis (Townsend, 1915)
Calodexia strigosa (Wulp, 1890)
Calodexia townsendi Curran, 1934
Calodexia valera Curran, 1934
Calodexia varia Curran, 1934
Calodexia venteris Curran, 1934

References

Exoristinae
Diptera of South America
Diptera of North America
Tachinidae genera
Taxa named by Frederik Maurits van der Wulp
Monotypic Brachycera genera